Elizabeth Colborne (1885–1948) was an American printmaker and illustrator.
Colborne was born in Chamberlain, South Dakota.
 
Her work is included in the collections of the Seattle Art Museum, the Whatcom Museum and the Minneapolis Institute of Art.

References

External links 

 Works by Elizabeth Colborne at Project Gutenberg

1885 births
1948 deaths
20th-century American women artists